Mickey Thomas may refer to:
 Mickey Thomas (footballer) (born 1954), Welsh football player
 Mickey Thomas (singer) (born 1949), American singer

See also
Michael Thomas (disambiguation)
Mick Thomas (born 1960), singer-songwriter